Miriam Gideon (October 23, 1906 – June 18, 1996) was an American composer.

Life
Miriam Gideon was born in Greeley, Colorado, on October 23, 1906. She studied organ with her uncle Henry Gideon and piano with Felix Fox. She also studied with Martin Bernstein, Marion Bauer, Charles Haubiel, and Jacques Pillois. She studied harmony, counterpoint, and composition with Lazare Saminsky and at his suggestion also composition with Roger Sessions, after which she abandoned tonality and wrote in a freely atonal or extended post-tonal style.

Gideon moved to New York City, where she taught at Brooklyn College, City University of New York (CUNY) from 1944 to 1954 and City College, CUNY from 1947 to 1955. She then taught at the Jewish Theological Seminary of America at the invitation of Hugo Weisgall in 1955, and at the Manhattan School of Music from 1967 to 1991. She was rehired by City College in 1971 as full professor and retired in 1976.

In 1949 Gideon married Brooklyn College assistant professor Frederic Ewen. Both were political leftists. Ewen, who refused to testify before the Rapp-Coudert Committee in 1940, was summoned to testify before the Senate Internal Security Committee chaired by Democratic Senator Pat McCarran in 1952. He retired to avoid testifying. Miriam Gideon was investigated by the FBI, and in 1954 and 1955 she resigned from her music teaching posts at City College and Brooklyn College.

Gideon composed a lot of vocal music, setting texts by Francis Thompson, Christian Morgenstern, Anne Bradstreet, Norman Rosten, Serafin, Joaquín Quintero and others. 
Selected compositions include Lyric Piece for Strings (1942), Mixco (1957), Adon Olom, Fortunato, Sabbath Morning Service, Friday Evening Service, and Of Shadows Numberless (1966).

She was the second woman inducted into American Academy and Institute of Arts and Letters in 1975, following Louise Talma who was inducted in 1974.

She died in New York City.

Gideon's 1958 opera Fortunato, edited by Stephanie Jensen-Moulton, was published as part of the Recent Researches in American Music series by A-R Editions in 2013. Jensen-Moulton has published extensively on Gideon, including a number of essays available online, including "Setting an 'Unused Poem': Miriam Gideon’s 'Böhmischer Krystall' " for the American Composers Alliance.

The Miriam Gideon Prize
The International Alliance for Women in Music (IAWM) offers the Miriam Gideon Prize annually for female undergraduate and graduate students who are members of IAWM. Applicants must be 50 years of age or over, and submit an original unpublished musical score for voice and piano or voice and small chamber ensemble.

Works
1 ADON OLOM (1957) - SATB, ob, tpt in C, strings: vl1, vl2, vla, vc, cb

2 ADON OLOM (1958) satb, piano/organ

3 AIR FOR VIOLIN & PIANO (1950)

4 AYELET HASHAKHAR (Morning Star) SONGS OF CHILDHOOD ON HEBREW TEXTS (1990)
  med voice, pf

5 BELLS (1966) for low or medium voice and piano

6 BÖHMISCHER KRYSTALL (1988) - Sop, fl,cl,vln,vcl,pf or Sop, pf

7 DIVERTIMENTO for Wind Quartet (1957) - fl, ob, cl, bsn

8 ECLOGUE (1990) - fl, pf

9 EPITAPHS FROM ROBERT BURNS (1952) for high, low voice versions with piano

10 FANTASY ON IRISH FOLK-MOTIVES (1975)
  for ob, bsn (or cello), vla, perc (1) (vib, glock, tam-tam (medium))

11 FAREWELL TABLET TO AGATHOCLES (from 'Songs of Voyage') (1961)
  for Med voice, pf

12 FORTUNATO (A Chamber Opera in 3 Scenes) (1958)
  piano, vocal soloists

13 GERMAN SONGS (1937) for high or low voice, piano

14 HABITABLE EARTH, THE (Cantata) (1966)
  satb soli, mixed chor, ob, pf or org

15 HOMMAGE A MA JEUNESSE (To My Youth) Sonatina for Two Pianos (1935)

15 bis THE HOUND OF HEAVEN (1945) for voice and instrumental chamber ensemble

16 LITTLE IVORY FIGURES PULLED WITH STRING (1950)
medium voice (some spoken, non-pitched, some sung) and guitar

17 LOCKUNG (1937) for high voice, piano

18 LYRIC PIECE (1941) for string orchestra

19 LYRIC PIECE (1955) for string quartet

20 MAY THE WORDS OF MY MOUTH (1957) SATB

21 MIXCO (1957)
voice and piano (high, med, and low versions available)

22 OF SHADOWS NUMBERLESS (Suite) (1966) for piano

23 POET TO POET (Song Cycle for High Voice and Piano) (1987)
24 QUARTET, for Strings (1946
25 RONDO APPASSIONATO (1990) for piano, perc, cell
26 SHE WEEPS OVER RAHOON (1940) for high voice and piano

27 SIX CUCKOOS IN QUEST OF A COMPOSER (1957) for piano

28 SLOW, SLOW FRESH FOUNT - TTBB

29 SLOW,SLOW FRESH FOUNT - SATB

30 SONATA FOR CELLO AND PIANO (1991)

31 SONATA FOR PIANO (1983)

32 SONATA FOR VIOLA & PIANO (1957)

33 SONGS OF VOYAGE (1964) for high voice or low voice, piano

34 SONNETS FROM FATAL INTERVIEW (1961) for mezzo soprano and piano

35 SONNETS FROM FATAL INTERVIEW (1961) for mezzo soprano, vln, vla, vcl

36 SONNETS FROM SHAKESPEARE (1986)  for medium low voice, piano

37 SONNETS FROM SHAKESPEARE (1986)
  for high or low voice, trumpet (Bb), string quartet OR string orchestra

38 STEEDS OF DARKNESS (1990) for high voice, fl, ob, perc, vc, pf

39 SUITE FOR CLARINET AND PIANO (1972) - cl in A (or bassoon) and piano

40 SWEET WESTERN WIND (1956) - SATB

41 SYMPHONIA BREVIS (1953)  2-2-2-2,4-2-2-0, timp, strings

42 TANGO LANGOROSO  for piano

43 THREE BIBLICAL MASKS (1958) - organ solo

44 THREE BIBLICAL MASKS (for Purim) (1979) for vln, pf

45 THREE CORNERED PIECES (1935) pf (for young musicians)

46 TO MUSIC (1990)  for high, medium, or low voice, with piano

47 THE TOO-LATE BORN (1939)  for high voice, piano

48 TRIO (1978) for clarinet in A, vcl, pf

49 VERGIFTET SIND MEINE LIEDER (1937) for high voice, piano

50 VOICES FROM ELYSIUM (1984) for high voice, fl, clar, vln, vcl, pf

51 WHERE WILD CARNATIONS BLOW (A Song to David)
  Soli, mixed choir, ch orch 1-1-0-0-, 0-2-0-0-,timp, strings

52 A WOMAN OF VALOR (EISHET CHAYIL) (1982)
  for medium voice, piano

Sources

Further reading
 Kielian-Gilbert, Marianne. "Of Poetics and Poeisis", p. 44-67. Discusses Of Shadows Numberless.
 Perle, George (1958). "The Music of Miriam Gideon", American Composers Bulletin 7/4, 4.
 Shaw, Jennifer (1995). "Moon Tides and male Poets: (En)gendering Identity in Miriam Gideon's Nocturnes, paper presented at the Feminist Theory and Music III conference, University of California at Riverside.

External links 
 Miriam Gideon Papers, 1905-1992 Music Division, New York Public Library for the Performing Arts.
 Art of the States: Miriam Gideon
 [ Miriam Gideon at AllMusicGuide]

Interviews
Miriam Gideon interview, June 18, 1986

1906 births
1996 deaths
American women classical composers
American classical composers
City University of New York faculty
Jewish American classical composers
Jewish Theological Seminary of America faculty
Manhattan School of Music faculty
Modernist composers
Pupils of Roger Sessions
People from Greeley, Colorado
Musicians from Colorado
Brooklyn College faculty
Members of the American Academy of Arts and Letters
20th-century classical composers
20th-century American women musicians
20th-century American composers
Women music educators
20th-century women composers
American women academics
20th-century American Jews